Khongsedone is a district (muang) of Saravane province in southern Laos.

References

Districts of Salavan province
Populated places on the Mekong River